Dan Moran was the first President of Conoco oil company. After E. W. Marland lost control of Marland Oil Company to J. P. Morgan in 1928, Moran was brought in as the new president. Moran successfully acquired Continental Oil Company and merged it with Marland Oil creating a new company called Conoco. Moran ran Conoco from 1928 to 1947 and saw the company successfully through the great depression and World War II. Under Moran's leadership, Conoco became a pioneer in offshore drilling, continental pipelines, petrochemicals, and aviation fuel.

Honors

Dan Moran Park in Ponca City, Oklahoma is named for Moran.

Moran is honored with a medallion at the Conoco Oil Pioneers of Oklahoma Plaza at Sam Noble Museum at the University of Oklahoma in Norman, Oklahoma.

References

External links
 Encyclopedia. "Conoco" retrieved June 13, 2021.
 ConocoPhillips. "Our History 1910 - 1929" retrieved June 13, 2021
 Course Hero. "Dan Moran" retrieved June 13, 2021.

American businesspeople in the oil industry
Petroleum in Oklahoma
Year of birth missing
Year of death missing
People from Ponca City, Oklahoma
ConocoPhillips people